General Frank may refer to:

August Frank (1898–1984), German SS lieutenant general
Karl Hermann Frank (1898–1946), German SS lieutenant general
Patrick Frank (fl. 1980s–2020s), U.S. Army major general

See also
Gustave H. Franke (1888–1953), U.S. Army major general
Victor Franke (1865−1936), German major general